The Dearborn River High Bridge is a Pratt half-deck truss bridge built in 1897, and has been placed on the National Register of Historic Places as it is one of the few bridges of its type left standing in the United States. On a half-deck bridge, the deck is attached in the center rather than, as is more common, top or bottom of the superstructure. The unusual design of the Dearborn River High Bridge suits it to carry light loads across high/deep crossings. It has four spans and a wooden plank deck. It is the last standing pin-connected Pratt half-deck truss bridge left in the United States. Construction cost was $9,997. Construction began in 1896 and completed in 1897.

This crossing point on the Dearborn River had been used for many years by the local Indian tribes, primarily the Blackfeet.  Prior to the bridge's construction this location was known as the Ponderay Crossing. The river was named for United States Secretary of War Henry Dearborn by Lewis and Clark in 1805. The area was left largely unexplored by Europeans for the next 50 years or so. The bridge was rehabilitated in 2003 by the Montana Department of Transportation, with Sletten Construction of Great Falls, Montana as the lead contractor, and was placed on the National Register of Historic Places on December 18, 2003.

See also
List of bridges documented by the Historic American Engineering Record in Montana
National Register of Historic Places listings in Lewis and Clark County, Montana

References

External links

Dearborn River High Bridge / Lewis and Clark County, Montana bridgehunter.com
Dearborn River High Bridge in Central Montana bigskyfishing.com

Bridges completed in 1897
Road bridges on the National Register of Historic Places in Montana
Historic American Engineering Record in Montana
National Register of Historic Places in Lewis and Clark County, Montana
Steel bridges in the United States
Pratt truss bridges in the United States
1897 establishments in Montana